The large moth family Crambidae contains the following genera beginning with "P":

References 

 P
Crambid